Eastside is a neighborhood in southeastern Lexington, Kentucky, United States. Its boundaries are Walton Avenue to the north, CSX railroad tracks to the east, Richmond Avenue to the south, and Main Street to the west.

Neighborhood statistics
 Area: 
 Population: 1,687
 Population density: 7,613 people per square mile
 Median household income: $42,655

References

Neighborhoods in Lexington, Kentucky